Xylocampa is a genus of moths of the family Noctuidae erected by the French entomologist, Achille Guenée in 1837.

Species
 Xylocampa areola (Esper, 1789)
 Xylocampa mustapha (Oberthür, 1920)

References
 Natural History Museum Lepidoptera genus database
 Xylocampa at  funet

Cuculliinae
Taxa named by Achille Guenée